Érsekcsanád (Croatian: Čanad or Čenad) is a  village in Bács-Kiskun county, in the Southern Great Plain region of southern Hungary. It is named after Csanád, the first head (comes) of the former Csanád County of Hungary in the first decades of the 11th century.

Geography

References

Populated places in Bács-Kiskun County